Niedersonthofener See is a lake in Oberallgäu, Bavaria, Germany. At an elevation of 703,30 m, its surface area is 135.30 ha. The lake is known for having a shape that is strikingly similar to that of a whale.

External links 
  

Lakes of Bavaria